The Rural Municipality of Manitou Lake No. 442 is a rural municipality (RM) in the Canadian province of Saskatchewan within Census Division No. 13 and  Division No. 6.

History 

The RM of Manitou Lake No. 442 incorporated as a rural municipality on December 12, 1910. It takes its name from Manitou Lake, which is Algonquian for "mysterious being".

In 1905, the first settlers came from Canadian regions, the British Isles, and the United States. The area was known as the Manitou Lake District. In 1907-1908 a post office was established in the home of Mr. Alex Wright, approximately one mile north-east of the present Marsden town site. The post office served the surrounding rural area. The Wrights named the post office 'Marsden'. One story recounts the name as originating from the birthplace of Mrs. Wright in Yorkshire, England; another reports it was named after the famous Marsden Rock near Newcastle, England. The adjacent area became known as the Marsden Rural Post Office District. Between 1919 and 1922, the post office was relocated one mile south to the RM office of Manitou Lake No. 442.

In 1905, the vast prairie land was covered with long grass referred to as 'prairie wool'. There were few trees or bluffs. The fertile black soil attracted many first settlers to the area and soon farms developed with sod and log homes. Farmers turned sod with horse and ox teams, sometimes using a walking plough (sulky) to prepare the ground for grain sowing. Grain was cut with binders, stooked, and threshed. Farmers hauled grain by wagon or horse-drawn sleigh to Zumbro and Artland. In the winter months, grain was hauled across the ice of Manitou Lake. Early settlers purchased groceries and supplies at Lashburn, Artland, or Chauvin, Alberta. A popular shopping method of the time was the Eaton's catalogue.

The settler's children first attended school in Learig, and in 1925 a four-room schoolhouse was built in the hamlet of Marsden.

Geography

Communities and localities 
The following urban municipalities are surrounded by the RM.

Villages
 Marsden

The following unincorporated communities are within the RM.

Localities
 Artland
 Unwin

Lakes and rivers 
The following is a list of notable lakes and rivers in the RM:
Manitou Lake
Wells Lake
Reflex Lakes
Battle River
Eyehill Creek

Demographics 

Economy 

Agriculture, cattle, and oil are primary industries for the population of 590 residents of the RM of Manitou Lake. Wheat, canola, barley, oats, peas, and flax are typical crops in the area. The region is famous for its prize-winning purebred cattle that include Hereford, Charolais, Simmental, and Angus. Agriculture diversification is noticeable with specialty livestock production such as elk and bison.

The oil industry plays a significant role in the local economy. Oil wells and batteries in the countryside evidence heavy crude oil extraction in the region.

Transportation 
The following is a list of Saskatchewan highways in the RM:
Saskatchewan Highway 40
Saskatchewan Highway 675
Saskatchewan Highway 680

Big Manitou Regional Park 
Big Manitou Regional Park is a regional park located on the north-west corner of Manitou Lake, near where the creek that drains Wells Lake flows into Manitou Lake. This park was originally established in 1975 as a part of Suffern Lake Regional Park. In 2019, it was granted full park status and officially named Big Manitou Regional Park. The park facilities include a campground with 32 campsites, showers, cookhouse, playgrounds, horseshoe pits, ball diamonds, and a soccer field. Manitou Lake Golf Club is also located in the park. It is a 9-hole, sand greens course.

Manitou Sand Hills 
Manitou Sand Hills are 105,000 acres of Crown grazing land set aside by the Saskatchewan government that surround much of the southern half of Manitou Lake in the southern portion of the RM. There is camping and guided trail rides through the Manitou Sand Hills, which are one of Western Canada's most distinctive landscapes.

Government 
The RM of Manitou Lake No. 442 is governed by an elected municipal council and an appointed administrator that meets on the first Thursday after the first Tuesday of every month. The reeve of the RM is Ian Lamb while its administrator is Joanne Loy. The RM's office is located in Marsden.

See also 
 List of rural municipalities in Saskatchewan
 List of communities in Saskatchewan
 List of protected areas of Saskatchewan

References 

M

Division No. 13, Saskatchewan
Dunes of Canada